Khalid Abdalla Mohamed Adam (born February 27, 1993) is a Qatari professional basketball player.  He currently plays for Al Gharafa Doha of the Qatari Basketball League.

He represented Qatar's national basketball team at the 2016 FIBA Asia Challenge in Tehran, Iran.

References

External links
 Asia-basket.com Profile
 2016 FIBA Asia Challenge Profile
 2015 FIBA Asia Championship Profile

1993 births
Living people
Forwards (basketball)
Qatari men's basketball players
People from Doha
Al-Gharafa SC basketball players